Bellbrae is a bounded rural locality in Victoria, Australia located just off the Great Ocean Road between Torquay and Anglesea. At the 2016 census, Bellbrae had a population of 865.

History
Bellbrae Post Office opened on 1 July 1923 (renamed from an earlier Jan Juc office) and closed in 1982.

Facilities 
Bellbrae has a public hall, a football oval where the Aireys Inlet Eels (a junior Australian Rules club) play their home games,  Bellbrae Primary School and a winery.

Community 

Bellbrae is mainly home to hobby farms and/or produce farms. An estimated 500 residents live in an area of 12 km2.

References

Towns in Victoria (Australia)
Surf Coast Shire